Thomas Cobbold may refer to:

Thomas Cobbold (1680–1752), brewer and founder of the Cobbold brewing business in Harwich
Thomas Cobbold (1708–1767), brewer and founder of the Cliff Brewery in 1746
Thomas Cobbold (diplomat) (Thomas Clement Cobbold) (1833–1883), MP for Ipswich
Thomas Spencer Cobbold (1828–1886), English man of science

See also
 Cobbold family tree, showing the relationship between the above